Corythoxestis praeustella is a moth of the family Gracillariidae. It is known from Java, Indonesia. The hostplants for the species include Nauclea orientalis.

References

Phyllocnistinae
Moths of Indonesia
Endemic fauna of Indonesia
Moths described in 1904